Jobst I, Count of Holstein-Schauenburg (1483-1531) was a German nobleman.  He was the ruling Count of Schauenburg and Holstein-Pinneberg from 1527 until his death.  He was a son of John IV (1449 – 30 March 1527) and his wife, Cordula of Gemen (d. 30 May 1528).

Marriage and issue 
In 1506, he married Mary of Nassau-Siegen (1491-1547), a daughter of Count John V of Nassau-Siegen.  Among their children were:
 Otto, died young
 Adolph III, Elector and Archbishop of Cologne from 1547 to 1556
 Anton, Elector and Archbishop of Cologne from 1556 to 1558
 John V ( – 1560), Count of Holstein-Schauenburg from 1531, married in 1555 to Countess Elisabeth of East Frisia (1531-1558)
 Cordula (1516-1542), married:
 on 8 April 1529 to Count Everwin of Bentheim (1461-13 December 1530)
 in 1536 to Count Gumprecht II of Neuenahr-Alpen
 Otto IV (1517-1576), co-ruler from 1531 to 1560, ruling Count of Holstein-Schauenburg from 1560
 Jobst II ( – 1581), ruling Lord of Gemen from 1531, married in 1561 to Elisabeth of Palland (d. 1606)
 William II (d. 1580), Provost of Hildesheim

References 
 C.Porskrog Rasmussen, E. Imberger, D. Lohmeier, I. Momsen (eds.): Die Fürsten des Landes, Neumünster 2008

External links 
 Genealogy of Holstein

Counts of Holstein
House of Schauenburg
1483 births
1531 deaths